Galbalcyrhynchus is a genus of birds in the Galbulidae family. Established by Marc Athanese Parfait Oeillet Des Murs in 1845, it contains the following species:

Species 

The name Galbalcyrhynchus is a combination of the genus name Galbula (used for many of the jacamars) and the genus name Alcyone (used for some of the kingfishers) with the Greek word rhunkhos, meaning "bill".

References

 
Bird genera
Taxonomy articles created by Polbot